Samira Mohamad Awad (born 30 June 2000) is a Lebanese footballer who plays as a winger for Lebanese club Safa.

Club career
Awad joined Safa in 2019; she scored 13 goals and made 11 assists in 14 games in the 2019–20 season.

Career statistics

International
Scores and results list Lebanon's goal tally first, score column indicates score after each Awad goal.

Honours 
Safa
 WAFF Women's Clubs Championship: 2022
 Lebanese Women's Football League: 2020–21

Lebanon U18
 WAFF U-18 Women's Championship runner-up: 2018

Lebanon
 WAFF Women's Championship third place: 2019

See also
 List of Lebanon women's international footballers

References

External links

 
 
 

2000 births
Living people
People from Baabda District
Lebanese women's footballers
Lebanon women's international footballers
Women's association football forwards
Women's association football wingers
Lebanese Women's Football League players
Lebanon women's youth international footballers
ÓBerytus players
Safa WFC players
Lebanese Muslims
21st-century Lebanese women